Zakynthiakos Football Club is a Greek football club based in Zakynthos, Greece.

They will play in Football League 2 for the season 2014-15.

Players

Current squad

Honors

Domestic Titles and honors
 Zakynthos Regional Championship: 1
 2013-14
 Zakynthos Regional Cup: 1 
 2013-14

External links

Football clubs in Zakynthyos
Football clubs in the Ionian Islands (region)
Gamma Ethniki clubs